Brenda Lee Stauffer (born April 8, 1961 in New Holland, Pennsylvania) is a former field hockey player from the United States. She was a member of the United States  bronze medal winning team at the 1984 Summer Olympics in Los Angeles, California. Brenda played field hockey at Pennsylvania State University making "collegiate player of the year" in 1982.

See also
List of Pennsylvania State University Olympians

References

External links
 

1961 births
Living people
American female field hockey players
Field hockey players at the 1984 Summer Olympics
Olympic bronze medalists for the United States in field hockey
People from New Holland, Pennsylvania
Penn State Nittany Lions field hockey players
Medalists at the 1984 Summer Olympics